Beaver Marsh Airport, also known as Beaver Marsh State Airport , is a public use airport located one nautical mile (2 km) southwest of Beaver Marsh, in Klamath County, Oregon, United States. The airport was previously owned by the State of Oregon after acquiring the airport from Crown-Zellerbach in 1964.

Facilities and aircraft 
Beaver Marsh Airport covers an area of 59 acres (19 ha) at an elevation of 4,638 feet (1,414 m) above mean sea level. It has one runway designated 18/36 with a dirt surface measuring 4,500 by 100 feet.
In 2020 the airport was expanded to 120 wide, clear of trees. The southern approach is now clear of timber for 1/2 mile.
There is an outhouse at the north end.
In 2020 a well was added for water suppression source for Wildland Firefighting.
2021 established a lit windsock on the beacon tower and helicopter blue lit pad. Solar landing strip lights are currently being installed.(2022)

Manager for access and questions of current conditions in Gary Mort 541-365-4489 or 541 365 4480.

For the 12-month period ending June 27, 2011, the airport had 150 general aviation aircraft operations, an average of 12 per month.

References

External links 
 Aerial image as of August 1994 from USGS The National Map
 

Airports in Klamath County, Oregon